Horden is an English surname. Notable people with the surname include:

 Hildebrand Horden (died 1696), London actor
 John Horden (1828–1893), the first Anglican Bishop of Moosonee
 Richard Horden (born 1944), British architect

See also
 Hor-Den early Egyptian king who ruled during the 1st dynasty

English-language surnames